Afrotyphlops is a genus of snakes in the family Typhlopidae.

Distribution
The 28 species of this genus are found in sub-Saharan Africa.

Species
The following species are recognized as being valid.
Angola blind snake (Afrotyphlops angolensis )
Angolan giant blind snake (Afrotyphlops anomalus )
Bibron's blind snake (Afrotyphlops bibronii )
Blanford's blind snake (Afrotyphlops blanfordii )
Somali giant blind snake (Afrotyphlops brevis )
Calabresi's blind snake (Afrotyphlops calabresii )
Chirio's blind snake (Afrotyphlops chirioi )
Blotched blind snake (Afrotyphlops congestus )
Wedge-snouted blind snake (Afrotyphlops cuneirostris )
Elegant blind snake (Afrotyphlops elegans )
Fornasini's blind snake (Afrotyphlops fornasinii )
Gierra's blind snake (Afrotyphlops gierrai )
Kaimosi blind snake (Afrotyphlops kaimosae )
Liberian blind snake (Afrotyphlops liberiensis )
Lined blind snake (Afrotyphlops lineolatus )
African giant blind snake (Afrotyphlops mucruso )
Kenyan dwarf blind snake (Afrotyphlops nanus )
Bicoloured blind snake (Afrotyphlops nigrocandidus )
Malawi blind snake (Afrotyphlops obtusus )
Tanga blind snake (Afrotyphlops platyrhynchus )
Spotted blind snake (Afrotyphlops punctatus )
Rondo blind snake (Afrotyphlops rondoensis )
(Afrotyphlops rouxestevae )
Schlegel's giant blind snake (Afrotyphlops schlegelii )
Schmidt's blind snake (Afrotyphlops schmidti )
Steinhaus's blind snake (Afrotyphlops steinhausi )
Liwale blind snake (Afrotyphlops tanganicanus )
Usambara blotched blind snake (Afrotyphlops usambaricus )

Nota bene: A binomial authority in parentheses indicates that the species was originally described in a genus other than Afrotyphlops.

References

Further reading
Broadley DG, Wallach V (2009). "A review of the eastern and southern African blind-snakes (Serpentes: Typhlopidae), excluding Letheobia Cope, with the description of two new genera and a new species". Zootaxa 2255: 1–100. (Afrotyphlops, new genus, p. 26; Afrotyphlops nanus, new species, p. 32).

 
Snake genera